Zyuzino is a rural locality (a selo) in the Ramensky District in Moscow Oblast, Russia. Population:

References

Rural localities in Moscow Oblast